Jo Ju-young (born 4 February 1994) is a South Korean footballer who plays as forward for Chungnan Asan FC in K League 2.

Career
Jo Ju-young joined K League Classic side Gwangju FC in January 2016.

He made his debut goal in his debut match against Jeonnam Dragons on 17 April 2016.

References

External links

1994 births
Living people
Association football forwards
South Korean footballers
Gwangju FC players
Incheon United FC players
K League 1 players
K League 2 players
Korea National League players
Ajou University alumni